Ngongo Lutete (or Gongo Lutete or Ngongo Leteta) was a Congolese leader and chieftain during the late 19th century.

Biography

As a boy Ngongo Lutete was enslaved by Arabs, but after winning his freedom he became a respected leader of the Batetela and Bakussu tribes in the Congo.  
Ngongo Lutete gained control of the region around Ngandu on the upper Lomani River.
In 1886, he joined forces with the Arab slave trader Tippu Tip near Stanley Falls, where Tip was organizing resistance to Leopold II's Congo Free State. 
On his expedition to Katanga, Alexandre Delcommune was given a magnificent reception at Ngandu by Ngongo between 2 May and 18 May 1891.

When the Congo Arab war began, Ngongo Lutete and his people fought for the Arabs initially, under the command of Tippu Tip's son Sefu bin Hamid.  
However, the Arabs failed to pay Lutete for his allegiance and also for some ivory which he had provided for them.
After losing a series of engagements with Francis Dhanis, late in 1892 he changed sides and was accepted as an ally by the Belgians.
This infuriated Sefu, who sent the Free State a message demanding that they surrender Lutete to him and threatening to drive his forces all the way to Stanleyville in the western Congo if they did not comply.

Ngongo Lutete fought for the Free State until September 1893, when he was accused of plotting to betray the Free State and executed. 
Lutete was executed after a drumhead court-martial chaired by a young Belgian lieutenant at which no credible evidence was presented. 
One story says that Ngongo had had his lieutenant, a Songye, killed for some offense. Other Songyes complained to the whites, presumably convincing them of treachery.
The story went on to say that the whites tied Ngongo up and fired at him all day without injuring him. It was only when they removed his amulets and fired into his ear, as directed by a Luba magician, that the spirits who had been protected him left and he died.
The soldiers he had brought over to the Belgians considered the trial to be a miscarriage of justice, and in 1895 they mutinied at Luluabourg and killed their Belgian commander.

References

Sources

1863 births
1893 deaths
People from Sankuru
Tetela people
History of the Democratic Republic of the Congo
People executed by the Congo Free State
People executed by Belgium by firing squad
Executed Democratic Republic of the Congo people
19th-century executions by Belgium
Arabian slaves and freedmen
19th-century slaves